Provincial Grand Lodges are administrative subdivisions of a Grand Lodge. Under the jurisdiction of the United Grand Lodge of England, they are the regional governing bodies of Freemasonry in the England, Wales, the Isle of Man, and the Channel Islands.

There are currently 47 Provincial Grand Lodges governed by UGLE, whose boundaries largely correspond to those of the historic counties of England. Each Provincial Grand Lodge is headed by a Provincial Grand Master.

The Grand Lodge uses a broadly similar administrative system for groups of lodges overseas, although these units are termed "District Grand Lodges". The Constitutions of the Grand Lodge also permit the formation of a similar administrative system for any large urban metropolitan area, to be known as a "Metropolitan Grand Lodge". At present only one such unit has been established, namely the Metropolitan Grand Lodge of London.

Provincial Grand Lodges 
(WITHIN ENGLAND, WALES, THE CHANNEL ISLANDS AND ISLE OF MAN)
 Bedfordshire -  Inaugurated: 1885
 Berkshire - Inaugurated: 1773 - then called Berkshire & Buckinghamshire PGL but were divided in 1890 
 Bristol
 Buckinghamshire - Inaugurated: 1890*
 Cambridgeshire - Inaugurated: 1796
 Cheshire - Inaugurated: 1725
 Cornwall
 Cumberland and Westmorland - Inaugurated: 1860
 Derbyshire - Inaugurated: 1826
 Devonshire - Inaugurated: 1775
 Dorset - Inaugurated: 1780
 Durham - Inaugurated: 1788 
 Essex
 Gloucestershire
 Guernsey and Alderney - Inaugurated: 1753
 Hampshire & Isle of Wight - Inaugurated: 1767
 Herefordshire
 Hertfordshire
 Isle of Man - Inaugurated: 1886
 Jersey - Inaugurated: 1753
 East Kent - 1973# Kent PGL was inaugurated in 1770 and split into East & West Kent in 1973
 West Kent - 1973# 
 East Lancashire - 1960 before then known as East Lancashire Division since 1826
 West Lancashire - 1960 then known as Lancashire West Division since 1826
 Leicestershire & Rutland
 Lincolnshire - Inaugurated: 1792
 London is outside the provincial structure being administered by Metropolitan Grand Lodge of London
 Middlesex
 Monmouthshire - 1753 as Northamptonshire PGL then as combined PGL in 1840
 Norfolk
 Northamptonshire & Huntingdonshire - Inaugurated: 1798
 Northumberland - Inaugurated: 1734
 Nottinghamshire 
 Oxfordshire - Inaugurated: 1717
 Shropshire
 Somerset
 Staffordshire - Inaugurated: 1791
 Suffolk - Inaugurated: 1772
 Surrey - Inaugurated: 1837
 Sussex
 North Wales - Inaugurated: 1727
 South Wales
 West Wales
 Warwickshire - Founded: Inaugurated: 1728
 Wiltshire - Inaugurated: 1775
 Worcestershire - Inaugurated: 1847
 Yorkshire, North & East Ridings - Inaugurated: 1817
 Yorkshire, West Riding - Inaugurated: 1817

Notes

United Grand Lodge of England
Freemasonry in England